Luray is a commune in the Eure-et-Loir department in northern France.

Population

Namesakes
Despite its small population, Luray is the eponym for the following places:
 Luray, Missouri
 Luray, Ohio
 Luray, South Carolina
 Luray, Tennessee
 Luray, Virginia, and by extension, Luray Caverns and Luray, Indiana

See also
Communes of the Eure-et-Loir department

References

Communes of Eure-et-Loir